Kain Tapper (6 June 1930, in Saarijärvi – 17 August 2004) was a Finnish sculptor. He created works that are "remote", evoking things contemplated from a distance. Even when small, his pieces loom like menhirs, their massiveness imposing an inhuman scale. He combined nature and natural phenomena, old folklore and modernism. He epitomised the Informalist style in Finnish sculpture. Tapper created a sculpture of Finnish poet Ilmari Kianto situated near Turja's Castle in Suomussalmi.

References

1930 births
2004 deaths
People from Saarijärvi
Modern sculptors
20th-century Finnish sculptors
Recipients of the Prince Eugen Medal